The Bama State Collegians is a student jazz orchestra made up of students at Alabama State University.  This group was organized in the late 1920s by Len Bowden, Fess Whatley, and Paul Bascomb. Bowden went on to direct the Navy's music program at Camp Robert Smalls during World War II. John Tuggle "Fess" Whatley (1895-1972) was inducted into the Alabama Music Hall of Fame and has a K-8 school in Birmingham named after him.

The Bama State Collegians have been directed by a number of notable musicians, including Tommy Stewart and Erskine Hawkins.

The group also holds an important place in jazz history. In 1934, the entire group travelled to New York and became the Erskine Hawkins Orchestra, recording hit records such as Tuxedo Junction, which rose to No. 7 nationally by Erskine Hawkins and No. 1 by Glenn Miller.  Members of this band worked with the NBC Orchestra, the Lucky Millinder Orchestra, the Duke Ellington Orchestra, Louis Armstrong and others.

Among those who have played with the orchestra are Dud Bascomb, Paul Bascomb, Avery Parrish, and Haywood Henry.

In 2011, the story of Erskine Hawkins and his start in the Bama State Collegians was the subject of a Florida State University Film School MFA Thesis Film "The Collegians", written and directed by Alabama State University alumn Bryan Lewis.

References

Sources 
 Biography of Erskine Hawkins form the archives of the Alabama Jazz Hall of Fame
 "The Birmingham Jazz Community: The Role and Contributions of Afro-Americans (up to 1940)" by Jothan McKinley Callins

External links 
 Alabama Jazz Hall of Fame website
 Erskine Hawkins at Alabama Jazz Hall of Fame
 Fess Whatley at Encyclopedia of Alabama
 Bama State Collegians at the Alabama Music Hall of Fame website

Alabama State University
Big bands
Musical groups established in the 1930s
American jazz ensembles from Alabama